Taoxi Town is an urban town in Anhua County, Hunan Province, People's Republic of China.

Administrative division
The town is divided into 12 villages and 2 communities, the following areas: Taodong Community, Taoxi Community, Changle Village, Nanshan Village, Leping Village, Yingjia Village, Fanggu Village, Doushan Village, He'an Village, Xinlian Village, Longdong Village, Wenxi Village, Meilanping Village, and Shangma Village (滔东社区、滔溪社区、长乐村、南山村、乐坪村、英家村、方谷村、斗山村、和安村、新联村、龙洞村、文溪村、梅兰坪村、上马村).

References

External links

Divisions of Anhua County